Reinerius (or Rainerius) Saccho (1200s – c. 1263) was a learned and zealous Italian Dominican.

Biography
He was born at Piacenza about the beginning of the thirteenth century; died about 1263. It is generally said that he died in 1258 or 1259, but this in an error, as we learn from the Brief of Urban IV, by which he was called to Rome, 21 July 1262. Little is known as to his youth and early manhood.

At an early age, he was converted by the Cathars (a dualistic sect), became one of their bishops, and remained amongst them for seventeen years, as we learn from his own humble avowal ("Summa contra Waldenses", vi). He was led back to the Catholic faith, most probably by the preaching of St. Peter Martyr, joined the Order of Preachers, then recently established, and laboured zealously for many years among the heretics of Upper Italy. After the martyrdom of St. Peter he was made inquisitor for Lombardy and the Marches of Ancona.

Being enraged against him, and yet unable to put him to death, the heretics finally succeeded in having him sent into exile. Thereafter we have no further mention of him except in the Papal Brief of Urban IV.

Writings
Coussord claimed to have discovered an old manuscript of Reinerius, though the text (Paris, 1548) in fact seems to have been a work of Yvonetus; his Tractatus de haeresi pauperum de Lugduno. Flacius also claimed to have, in the Catalogus testium veritatis ("De Waldensibus", Basel, 1556). The "Summa de catharis et leonistis, seu pauperibus de Lugduno" (Martène in Thes. Nov. Anecd. V Paris, 1717) is according to Gieseler the only authentic work ascribed to Reinerius. The work is a description of Cathar sects and doctrines, and was regarded as a great authority during the Middle Ages. The edition of Gretser (Ingolstadt, 1613) is much interpolated, so as (except interceding pages of chapter six) to be more a miscellany on late 13-century heretical factions, collected from various sources by an anonymous German inquisitor in Austria after Reinerius' death.

External links
 Catholic Encyclopedia article

13th-century Italian Roman Catholic theologians
Italian Dominicans
1263 deaths
Year of birth unknown
People from Piacenza